LA Weekly Theater Award was an annual critics' award system established in 1979, organized by the LA Weekly for outstanding achievements in small theatre productions in Southern California.  Nominees were typically announced in January for Equity 99-seat productions from the previous year, with awards handed out in March or April. The 35th annual awards ceremony was held in April 2014.  In December 2014, the LA Weekly announced that it was discontinuing the awards, citing the publication's desire to focus on events that would promote its profitability.

Categories

Production
 Production of the Year
 Revival Production of the Year (of a 20th- or 21st-century work)
 Musical of the Year

Performance
 Ensemble
 Musical Ensemble
 Comedy Ensemble
 Leading Female Performance
 Leading Male Performance
 Supporting Female Performance
 Supporting Male Performance
 Two-Person Performance
 Solo Performance
 Female Comedy Performance
 Male Comedy Performance
 Musical Performance
 One-Act Performance

Direction/Choreography/Design
 Direction
 Direction of a Musical
 Comedy Direction
 One-Act Direction
 Choreography
 Production Design
 Lighting Design
 Costume Design
 Set Design
 Sound Design
 Mask Design
 Puppet Design

Writing/Composition
 Play Writing
 Adaptation
 Original Music

Special Achievement
 Career Achievement
 Queen of the Angels

References

External links
 30th LA Weekly Theater Award Nominees on LA Weekly site

American theater awards
Awards established in 1979
Awards disestablished in 2012